I Lost My Heart in Heidelberg (German: Ich hab mein Herz in Heidelberg verloren) is a 1926 German silent film directed by Arthur Bergen and starring Emil Höfer, Gertrud de Lalsky and Werner Fuetterer. The title alludes to the popular 1925 song I Lost My Heart in Heidelberg composed by Fred Raymond with lyrics by Fritz Löhner-Beda and Ernst Neubach. The film taps into the nostalgic reputation of Old Heidelberg.

Cast
 Emil Höfer as Pastor Schönhoff 
 Gertrud de Lalsky as Sophie, seine Frau 
 Werner Fuetterer as Rudolf - sein Sohn 
 Mary Parker as Charlotte, seine Tochter 
 Sylvester Bauriedl as Fritz Merkelbach - Cand.med. Erstchargierter 
 Harry Halm as Alex Winkler, Fuchsmajor 
 Karl Platen as Georg Schröder - Corpsdiener 
 Dorothea Wieck as Klärchen - seine Tochter 
 Viktor Gehring as Ingenieur Frank 
 Carla Färber as Trude - Klärchens Freundin 
 I.W. Lautsch as Bornschläger 
 Maria Meyerhofer as seine Frau 
 Josef Eichheim as Schneidermeister Stenglein 
 Else Kündinger as seine Frau 
 Frau Heuberger-Schönemann as Frau Klinger 
 Georg Irmer as Fritz Merkelbach

References

Bibliography
 Lamb, Andrew. 150 Years of Popular Musical Theatre. Yale University Press, 2000.

External links

1926 films
Films of the Weimar Republic
German silent feature films
Films directed by Arthur Bergen
Films set in Heidelberg
Bavaria Film films
German black-and-white films